Kuruvadi is a Town panchayat in Ramanathapuram district Kadaladi Taluk in the India state of Tamil Nadu.

Cities and towns in Ramanathapuram district